The urinary meatus, also known as the external urethral orifice, is the opening of the urethra. It is the point where urine exits the urethra in both sexes and where semen exits the urethra in males. The meatus has varying degrees of sensitivity to touch. The meatus is located on the glans of the penis or in the vulval vestibule.

In human males

The male external urethral orifice is the external opening or urinary meatus, normally located at the tip of the glans penis, at its junction with the frenular delta. It presents as a vertical slit, possibly bounded on either side by two small labia-like projections, and continues longitudinally along the front aspect of the glans, which facilitates the flow of urine micturition. In some cases, the opening may be more rounded. This can occur naturally or may also occur as a side effect of excessive skin removal during circumcision. The meatus is a sensitive part of the male reproductive system.

In human females

The female external urethral orifice is the external opening of the urethra, from which urine is ejected during urination. It is located about  behind the clitoris and immediately in front of the vagina in the vulval vestibule. It usually assumes the form of a short, sagittal cleft with slightly raised margins. To its left and right are the openings of the Skene's glands.

Some evidence exists to suggest that the clitoral-urinary meatus distance (CUMD) in human females relates to the ease with which the female may achieve orgasm through penetrative sex. Orgasm from penetration alone is observed to be more likely as CUMD decreases.

Evidence also suggests that decreased distance from the vaginal opening to the urethral meatus is associated with recurrent post-coital urinary tract infections.  Surgical repositioning of the distal urethra to prevent recurrent post-coital urinary tract infections has been employed with some success by Russian physicians.

In other mammals
Unlike most other mammals (including human), female spotted hyenas have a urinary meatus that is located on the clitoral glans.

Clinical significance
Congenital disorders of the meatus, in the male, include epispadias (the misplacement to the upper aspect) and hypospadias (the misplacement to the underside of the penis). A congenital misshaping can result in its narrowing (meatal stenosis), causing a partial or total urinary blockage or the bifurcation of the urinary stream. A urethral blockage can also be caused by foreign material, kidney stones, or bladder stones (lithiasis).

Additional images

See also
 Urogenital opening

Notes

References

Urinary system
Urethra